Maupiti is an island in the western Leeward Islands in French Polynesia. It has a population of 1,286 people. The largest town is Vaiea.

Geography
Maupiti is a volcanic island, and lies on the Society hotspot. It is estimated to be 3.9 - 4.5 million years old. The island is a "near atoll", consisting of a central volcanic peak surrounded by a lagoon and barrier reef with four motu: Auira, Pa'ao, Tuanai, Tiapaa and Pitiahe.

History
There are ancient Polynesian archaeological artifacts dating from at least AD 850 in Maupiti. A burial site excavated in 1962 suggested early cultural links with New Zealand.

The first European to arrive on the island was the Dutchman Jakob Roggeveen in 1722. Historically, the island has had strong cultural links with Bora Bora.

Economy

Maupiti Airport, located on the motu of Tuanai, provides a connection to the rest of French Polynesia. The primary economic activity on Maupiti was noni production.

Administration
Maupiti is administratively part of the commune (municipality) of Maupiti, itself in the administrative subdivision of the Leeward Islands. The main settlement is Vaiea.

References

External links

MAUPITI VIDÉO HD

Islands of the Society Islands